Repyevka is a rural locality (a village) in Tuzlukushevsky Selsoviet, Belebeyevsky District, Bashkortostan, Russia. The population was 29 as of 2010. There is 1 street.

Geography 
Repyevka is located 13 km northeast of Belebey (the district's administrative centre) by road. Ismagilovo is the nearest rural locality.

References 

Rural localities in Belebeyevsky District